Enigmatic is the fourth album by Czesław Niemen released in 1970. It is considered to be the best Polish rock album ever.
Inspired in 1968 by Wojciech Młynarski, Niemen decided to make his new album with Polish poetry as lyrics. Recorded in 1969, the album became very popular and was awarded with a golden record in 1971 (in Poland, Golden Records were awarded for selling 160,000 album copies). As of 2012, the album has sold in excess of 5 million copies around the world and remains very popular.

In 1974 "Bema pamięci żałobny rapsod" was rerecorded by Niemen in New York and issued by CBS Records International as "Mourner's Rhapsody". The supporting musicians included Michał Urbaniak of the original crew, John Abercrombie and some members of the famous Mahavishnu Orchestra.

In 1977 the "Bema pamięci żałobny rapsod" intro from the 1970 initial issue was bootlegged by the West German rock band Jane as intro for their elegiac album "Between Heaven and Hell" also immediately achieving golden record status.

Track listing 
 "Bema pamięci żałobny rapsod" - 16:27 (music Czesław Niemen, lyrics Cyprian Kamil Norwid)
 "Jednego serca" - 7:45 (music Czesław Niemen, lyrics Adam Asnyk)
 "Kwiaty ojczyste" - 7:25 (music Czesław Niemen, lyrics Tadeusz Kubiak)
 "Mów do mnie jeszcze" - 4:40 (music Czesław Niemen, lyrics Kazimierz Przerwa-Tetmajer)

Personnel 
Czesław Niemen – vocal, Hammond organ
Zbigniew Namysłowski – alto saxophone
Janusz Zieliński – bass
Tomasz Jaśkiewicz – guitar
Czesław Bartkowski – drums 
Zbigniew Sztyc – tenor saxophone
Michał Urbaniak – tenor saxophone, flute
Alibabki – background vocals

References

Czesław Niemen albums
1970 albums
Polish-language albums
Polskie Nagrania Muza albums